Conophytum chrisolum is a species of succulent plant in the family Aizoaceae. It is endemic to the Richtersveld region of North Cape Province, South Africa  and may be the smallest free-living, land dwelling (non-aquatic) flowering plant, and certainly is the smallest succulent, measuring  no more than 0.4 inch (10 mm) in height  by less than 0.25 inch (6 mm)in width. It never branches or divides.  It was only discovered in 1994 by botanical explorer Chris Rodgerson The solitary magenta colored flower, up to 0.8 inch (20 mm) in diameter,  is wider than the plant.

References

chrisolum
Flora of South Africa